Ninodes is a genus of moths in the family Geometridae. The genus was erected by William Warren in 1894.

Species
Ninodes flavimedia Warren, 1907
Ninodes splendens Butler, 1878 (Japan)
Ninodes watanabei Inoue, 1976 (Japan)

References

Abraxini
Geometridae genera